("God goes up with jubilation" or "God has gone up with a shout"), is a church cantata by Johann Sebastian Bach. He composed it in Leipzig for the Feast of the Ascension and first performed it on 30 May 1726. It begins with a quotation from Psalm 47.

History and words 
Bach composed the cantata in his third year in Leipzig for the feast of Ascension. The prescribed readings for the feast day were from the Acts of the Apostles, the prologue and Ascension, and from the Gospel of Mark, Jesus telling his disciples to preach and baptise, and his Ascension.

The text of the cantata is unusual as it consists mostly of a poem in six stanzas, which forms movements 5 to 10 of the work in 11 movements. The structure is similar to that of cantatas by Bach's cousin Johann Ludwig Bach, court conductor in Meiningen, that Bach performed during 1726: Old Testament quotation, recitative, aria, New Testament quotation, poem, chorale. The first quotation is taken from Psalm 47 and is traditionally understood as a reference to the Ascension. The other quotation in movement 4 is verse 19 from the gospel. An unknown poet paraphrased in recitative and aria an idea from Psalm 68 as well as its quotation in the Epistle to the Ephesians, "when he ascended up on high, he led captivity captive". In movement 7 he used the motif of Christ in the winepress.

The cantata is closed by the first and thirteenth stanza of Johann Rist's hymn "" (1641). Bach would later use stanza four of the chorale for his Ascension Oratorio. The cantata consists of two parts, to be performed before and after the sermon. Bach first performed it on 30 May 1726.

Scoring and structure 

The cantata is festively scored for four vocal soloists (soprano, alto, tenor and bass), a four-part choir, three trumpets, timpani (tamburi in the autograph), two oboes, two violins, viola and basso continuo.

Music 

The opening chorus with the full orchestra is the "centre of gravity" of the cantata. It opens with an introduction marked "adagio", played by the strings doubled by the oboes. Then a fugue begins, two instrumental entries are followed by choral entries, a climax is  reached in an entry of the first trumpet. A second fugue includes remote and minor keys. The second part of the text, "" (sing praises to God, sing praises unto our King) is first sung in homophony, but then presented in a third fugue on the theme of the first, followed by a homophonic coda. A secco recitative leads to the first aria, accompanied by the violins in unison. The complete text is sung three times in different sections. The New Testament quotation is sung not by the bass as the  but, likely because Jesus is not speaking himself, instead the soprano narrates "So then after the Lord had spoken unto them, he was received up into heaven, and sat on the right hand of God" as a secco recitative. Movement 5 concludes Part I and is based on the first stanza of the poem. The soprano is accompanied by the strings, doubled by the oboes. In the middle section, the words "" (He finishes His course on earth, literally: "He finishes the course of the earth") are expressed by an upward melisma and one downward on the repeat of the words.

Part II handles the other five stanzas of the poem, alternating recitative and aria. The first recitative is accompanied by the strings, the others are secco. The bass aria is highlighted by an obbligato trumpet part, but it is so difficult that Bach gave it to a violin in a later performance. The words "" (full of sorrow, torment and pain) are illustrated by a slower tempo and harmonic tension. The following recitative refers in the end to the view towards heaven, expressed by an upward motion. The last aria, accompanied by the oboes, enjoys the victory over the enemies, in a vision of peace rather than a description of a battle, but stresses the words "" (out of suffering, distress and ignominy) by "harmonic darkening". According to Klaus Hofmann, the setting was composed not by Bach himself, but by Christoph Peter (1626–89), cantor in Guben, as printed in the Neu Leipziger Gesangbuch (New Leipzig hymnal) of 1682.

Recordings 
 Bach Cantatas Vol. 9, Günther Ramin, Thomanerchor, Gewandhausorchester, Gertrud Birmele, Eva Fleischer, Gert Lutze, Johannes Oettel, Archiv Produktion 1951
 Les Grandes Cantates de J.S. Bach Vol. 9, Fritz Werner, Heinrich-Schütz-Chor Heilbronn, Pforzheim Chamber Orchestra, Friederike Sailer, Claudia Hellmann, Helmut Krebs, Jakob Stämpfli, Erato 1961
 Bach Kantaten, Vol. 4: BWV 127, BWV 159, BWV 43 , Diethard Hellmann, Bachchor und Bachorchester Mainz, Nobuko Gamo-Yamamoto, Annelies Westen, Horst Wilhelm, Dieter Slembeck, SWF late 1960s?
 J. S. Bach: Das Kantatenwerk (1), Hans Grischkat, Bach-Orchester Stuttgart, Csilla Zentai, Erika Schmidt, Kurt Huber, Michael Schopper, FSM 1971
 J. S. Bach: Das Kantatenwerk – Sacred Cantatas Vol. 3, Nikolaus Harnoncourt, Wiener Sängerknaben, Chorus Viennensis, Concentus Musicus Wien, boy soprano of the Wiener Sängerknaben, Paul Esswood, Kurt Equiluz, Ruud van der Meer, Teldec 1975
 Die Bach Kantate Vol. 34, Helmuth Rilling, Gächinger Kantorei, Bach-Collegium Stuttgart, Arleen Augér, Julia Hamari, Lutz-Michael Harder, Philippe Huttenlocher, Hänssler 1982
 J. S. Bach: Himmelfahrts-Oratorium, Philippe Herreweghe, Collegium Vocale Gent, Barbara Schlick, Catherine Patriasz, Christoph Prégardien, Peter Kooy, Harmonia Mundi France 1993
 J. S. Bach: Ascension Cantatas, John Eliot Gardiner, Monteverdi Choir, English Baroque Soloists, Nancy Argenta, Michael Chance, Anthony Rolfe Johnson, Stephen Varcoe, Archiv Produktion 1993
 Bach Edition Vol. 19 – Cantatas Vol. 10, Pieter Jan Leusink, Holland Boys Choir, Netherlands Bach Collegium, Ruth Holton, Sytse Buwalda, Nico van der Meel, Bas Ramselaar, Brilliant Classics 2000
 J.S. Bach: Complete Cantatas Vol. 16, Ton Koopman, Amsterdam Baroque Orchestra & Choir, Johannette Zomer, Bogna Bartosz, Christoph Prégardien, Klaus Mertens, Antoine Marchand 2002
 J. S. Bach: Cantatas Vol. 44, Masaaki Suzuki, Bach Collegium Japan, Rachel Nicholls, Robin Blaze, Gerd Türk, Peter Kooy, BIS 2008

Notes

References

Sources 
 
 Gott fähret auf mit Jauchzen BWV 43; BC A 77 / Sacred cantata (Ascension Day) Leipzig University
 Cantata BWV 43 Gott fähret auf mit Jauchzen: history, scoring, sources for text and music, translations to various languages, discography, discussion, Bach Cantatas Website
 BWV 43 Gott fähret auf mit Jauchzen: English translation, University of Vermont
 BWV 43 Gott fähret auf mit Jauchzen: text, scoring, University of Alberta 
 
 BWV 43.11 bach-chorales.com

Church cantatas by Johann Sebastian Bach
1726 compositions
Psalm-related compositions by Johann Sebastian Bach
Ascension of Jesus